The Jilț is a right tributary of the river Jiu in Romania. It discharges into the Jiu in Turceni.

Tributaries

The following rivers are tributaries to the river Jilț (from source to mouth):

Left: Valea Racilor
Right: Valea lui Voicu, Jilțul Slivilești, Jilțul Mic, Borăscu

References

Rivers of Romania
Rivers of Gorj County